Lindley is a given name. Notable people with the name include:

 Lindley Beckworth (1913–1984), U.S. Representative from Texas 
 Lindley Bothwell (1901–1986), American citrus grower and automobile collector
 Lindley Darden (born 1945), American philosopher of science
 Lindley DeVecchio (born 1940), former FBI agent
 Lindley Evans (1895–1982), Australian pianist and composer
 Lindley Fraser (1904–1963), Scottish broadcaster and economist
 Lindley H. Hadley (1861–1948), U.S. Representative from Washington State
 Lindley Miller Garrison (1864–1932), American lawyer and U.S. Secretary of War
 Lindley Jenkins (born 1954), English footballer 
Lindley Johnson (1854—1937), American architect 
 Lindley Murray  (1745–1826), American lawyer and grammarian
 Lindley Murray Hoag  (1808–1880), American Quaker missionary
 Lindley Murray Moore (1788–1871), American abolitionist and educator

Spike Jones (1911–1965), born Lindley Armstrong Jones, American musician and bandleader
Spike Jones Jr. (born 1949 as Lindley Armstrong Jones Jr.), American television producer and director

See also 
 Lindley (surname)
 Lindley (disambiguation)